Aaron Dingle (previously Sugden-Dingle, also Livesy) is a fictional character from the British soap opera Emmerdale, played by Danny Miller. The character was originally played by Danny Webb and appeared in a recurring capacity. Aaron made his first appearance during the episode broadcast on 24 December 2003. When Aaron was reintroduced in 2008, he was promoted to the full-time cast and the decision was made to recast the role. Miller successfully auditioned for the part and later admitted that he would have quit acting if he had not been cast.

Aaron is the son of Chas Dingle (Lucy Pargeter) and Gordon Livesy (Gerard Fletcher/Gary Mavers). His storylines have included being involved with the criminal McFarlane family, making a romantic advance towards his best friend Adam Barton (Adam Thomas) which resulted in attempted suicide, coming to terms with his homosexuality, his relationship with Jackson Walsh (Marc Silcock), and dealing with Jackson's suicide. Miller chose to leave the show in November 2011 and he made his final appearance on 5 April 2012. Aaron's exit storyline saw him accused of arson and so he left the village with his new partner Ed Roberts (Lloyd Everitt).

Two years later, Miller reprised the role and Aaron returned on 14 August 2014, as part of a heist storyline involving Donna Windsor (Verity Rushworth) and Ross Barton (Michael Parr). The character's most notable storylines since his return have been his affair and subsequent relationship with Robert Sugden (Ryan Hawley), his role in Katie Sugden's (Sammy Winward) death, self-harming, revealing that he was sexually abused by his father Gordon when he was a child which made him attempt suicide once more, reuniting with his estranged half-sister Liv Flaherty (Isobel Steele) and becoming her guardian, being sent to prison for grievous bodily harm, and breaking up and reuniting with Robert, playing a part in raising his son, and marrying him. In November 2021, it was announced that Miller would be competing in the ITV series I'm a Celebrity...Get Me Out of Here! and that he would be leaving Emmerdale once again and Aaron departed on 6 December 2021. However, the following year, Miller returned to the role of Aaron for a guest stint on 3 October 2022 to celebrate Emmerdales 50th anniversary with Aaron departing once again on 31 October 2022.

Storylines

2003–2006
When Aaron (Danny Webb) was young, his parents, Gordon Livesy (Gerard Fletcher) and Chas Dingle (Lucy Pargeter), separated and Chas left her son to live with his father and Gordon's second wife, Sandra (Janet Bamford). Aaron visits his mother in Emmerdale, where he tells her that he resents her for not raising him and explains that he feels that she abandoned him. The two begin to bond, before Aaron returns home to his father. Aaron returns to visit Chas, but she reprimands him after she catches him talking to other people about her behind her back.

Louise Appleton (Emily Symons) witnesses Chas slapping Aaron and tells Gordon when he arrives to collect his son. Gordon tells Chas that her relationship with her son is over and that Aaron will not visit her again. Despite this, Aaron returns to Emmerdale several months later, staying longer than expected as he came into contact with a person who had German measles and Sandra was pregnant. Aaron returns home to his father and his stepmother, after telling Chas that while she was in the Army, her partner Carl King (Tom Lister) had a one-night stand with her cousin, Del Dingle (Hayley Tamaddon).

2008–2012
Aaron (now Danny Miller) returns to the village two years later and is arrested by Ross Kirk (Samuel Anderson) for possession of drugs. He is cautioned then meets his mother but later runs away after Chas takes him home. Gordon reveals that he threw Aaron out for hitting Sandra, Chas' family learn that he is a drug courier for the McFarlanes and they bring him to Emmerdale after Gordon refuses to take him back.

Aaron clashes with Victoria Sugden (Isabel Hodgins) but they eventually become friends and Aaron helps rescue her when she falls into a frozen lake. Aaron convinces his cousin, Belle Dingle (Eden Taylor-Draper), to take the day off school and is also caught stealing so Lisa (Jane Cox) throws him out. Consequently, he and Chas move into Smithy Cottage with Paddy Kirk (Dominic Brunt) and Chas gives him the choice of going to college or getting a job so he gets a job at Cain's garage. Aaron begins dating Victoria and loses his virginity to her but they break up when he discovers her relationship with her foster brother, Daz Eden.  When Aaron ignites a bale of hay at the Bartons' farm Holly's father, John (James Thornton), hits him and locks him in a stable. Aaron reports John to the police but later drops the charges.

Aaron discovers that Chas has resumed her relationship with Carl and he tells her that he wants nothing more to do with her.  He refuses to move in with her and Carl and, after much convincing, gets Paddy to agree to let him stay with him.  In anger over his mother's new relationship, he tampers with the brakes on Carl's car, but when he realises that Jimmy and Nicola King are driving it with their infant daughter, he stops them and fixes it.  When Chas finds out, she angrily tells him that she does not want anything to do with him anymore.  After this, Aaron slowly starts to change into a better person.  Despite Paddy's initial annoyance at his presence, the two form a close father-son relationship.

Aaron begins dating Holly Barton (Sophie Powles) and makes friends with her brother, Adam (Adam Thomas).  After Aaron and Adam are involved in a run-off-road collision, Aaron tries to kiss Adam. Aaron is embarrassed and tells Adam that he misunderstood the situation. Aaron sleeps with Holly and Adam tells his family that he thinks Aaron is gay. Adam tells Aaron that he is fine with him being gay but he does not want his sister to be used. Aaron denies it but Holly ends their relationship.

Aaron visits a gay bar and meets Jackson Walsh (Marc Silcock), he leaves his phone behind and Jackson returns it. Aaron returns to the bar to meet Jackson. When Paddy discovers that Aaron has visited a gay bar he asks if he Aaron is gay only for Aaron to violently attack him. Aaron apologises and admits that he is gay but rejects his sexuality. Jackson comes to the village to talk to Aaron. They go to kiss but are interrupted. After a night out at the bar Jackson and Aaron eventually kiss. Jackson comes to The Woolpack and when he touches Aaron's arm, Aaron punches him. Aaron is charged with ABH and told that he will stand trial. Aaron tries to kill himself at the garage but his uncle, Cain Dingle (Jeff Hordley), and Adam find him in time. During his court case Aaron admits that he hit Jackson because he himself is gay and struggling with this situation, Aaron is sentenced to community service. He meets Wayne Dobson (Gary Hanks) who taunts him about his sexuality, back in the village Jackson witnesses this and sticks up for Aaron. After talking things through, Aaron and Jackson start dating.

Aaron sells a clocked car to Mickey Hall (Lee Oakes). Aaron uses his dog, Clyde, to try to intimidate Mickey but Mickey sets his own dog on Clyde, seriously injuring him, so Clyde had to be put down. Jackson and Aaron argue and Jackson tells Aaron that he loves him. Aaron thinks things are becoming too serious and the pair do not talk for days. Aaron and Jackson invite Paddy and Marlon Dingle (Mark Charnock) on a night out. Jackson is hurt when Aaron does not say he loves him too and after realising that Aaron will not change his violent tendencies, Jackson drives off. Aaron tries to phone him and later finds Jackson has crashed his van onto a railway and has been hit by a train. Jackson is permanently paralysed from the neck down and Aaron tells him that he will not walk again as Jackson's mother, Hazel Rhodes (Pauline Quirke), cannot do it. Jackson blames Aaron for the crash and they break up, Aaron refuses to see Jackson, even when Hazel asks him to.

Aaron and Jackson get back together and Aaron helps Jackson and Hazel move into Dale Head. Jackson's mood starts to deteriorate and he pushes Aaron away. Aaron meets Flynn Buchanan (Ryan Prescott) and he feels like he is cheating on Jackson. Aaron tells Flynn about Jackson and that he cannot forget about him. Aaron then tells Jackson that he loves him. Aaron watches Jackson's video diary and is shocked to hear Jackson admit that he wants to die, he tells Hazel and they try to work out how to help Jackson. Aaron confesses to Jackson that both he and Hazel have watched his video diary. Aaron and Hazel then become determined to show Jackson that he has a life worth living. Jackson is admitted to hospital with a chest infection and it strengthens his resolve to end his life. Jackson, Aaron and Hazel go to Whitby and Aaron books Jackson on a tandem skydive. Aaron thinks Jackson has changed his mind about dying, but he has not. Aaron is shocked to learn that Jackson has managed to convince Hazel to help him end his life. Jackson later promises Aaron that nothing is going to happen until Aaron is ready. Jackson breaks up with Aaron to make the process easier and Aaron agrees to help Jackson end his life. Jackson tells his mother and Aaron how grateful he is for their support and – when Hazel cannot give Jackson the pills – Aaron takes the cup and gives it to Jackson. Jackson then dies and Aaron runs through the village. He then tells Adam about Jackson's death and his part in it.

The police investigate Jackson's death and arrest Aaron for murder. Aaron is forced to miss the funeral as he is due in court. He is released on bail and he goes to Jackson's grave to say goodbye. At his trial, Aaron is found not guilty of murder. However, Aaron blames himself for Jackson's death and starts lashing out at people. Aaron breaks into Carl's house with the intention of getting arrested, but Carl does not press charges. Aaron moves into The Woolpack with Chas and begins self-harming. During a drive Aaron starts speeding and crashes the car, Chas suffers minor injuries. When Sean Spencer (Luke Roskell) steals money from the garage Aaron chases after him then collapses. When he recovers Chas tries to get him to open up to her about his problems, later she catches Aaron self-harming and he starts attending counselling sessions. He also takes a break from the village for a while.

Aaron meets Ed Roberts (Lloyd Everitt) when he brings a minibus to the garage to be fixed and they slowly begin a relationship.  Ed tells Aaron that he has been signed for a French rugby club and is leaving for France in four weeks.  He asks Aaron to come with him but he turns him down.  Aaron later spots a fire in the garage and helps Adam save Cain, who had become trapped.  Aaron then learns Adam deliberately started the fire and, not wanting his friend to be sent to prison, tells the police that he was responsible for the fire.  He is released on bail but on the day of his court hearing, Aaron goes to France with Ed.

2014–2020

Aaron returns to stop Adam participating in a robbery with Ross Barton (Michael Parr) and Donna Windsor (Verity Rushworth). After the robbery and Donna's subsequent death, Adam confesses to the garage arson, so Aaron can come home. However, Aaron is arrested for perverting the course of justice but returns to the village after receiving a suspended sentence. He moves into The Woolpack with Chas, her boyfriend, James Barton (Bill Ward), and Diane Sugden (Elizabeth Estensen). Aaron then has a one-night stand with Finn Barton (Joe Gill), James' son. Aaron resumes working at Debbie's garage where he gets caught up in a car scam with Ross and Charity Dingle (Emma Atkins).

A few weeks later Robert Sugden (Ryan Hawley) asks Aaron to fix his car and the pair kiss and they have sex, starting an affair. Katie Sugden (Sammy Winward) suspects that Robert is cheating on his fiancée, Chrissie White (Louise Marwood) and sets about trying to prove it. Aaron seduces Robert into a kiss and Katie photographs it. Aaron leaves making Robert alone with Katie. Robert pushes Katie leading to her death. Robert calls Aaron for help, and they get rid of any evidence. Aaron begins self-harming to cope with his guilt. Aaron tells Chrissie the truth about his affair with Robert. Robert is shot, sending him into a coma. Adam and Victoria accidentally film Aaron concealing the gun in a car at the scrapyard. Adam confronts Aaron, who admits hiding it to protect his mother because he believed she was guilty. Rakesh Kotecha (Pasha Bocarie) reports it to the police and Aaron is arrested and charged with possession of a firearm and attempted murder. Already having a suspended sentence, he is immediately remanded in custody. Aaron pleads not guilty and Robert tries to goad Aaron into telling the truth. Aaron angrily shouts that he should have done everyone a favour and died. After discovering Andy's involvement in his shooting, Robert makes a false statement to get Aaron released.

Aaron's father, Gordon (Gary Mavers), visits the village. Aaron becomes upset and starts self harming. Aaron admits to Robert that Gordon raped him when he was a child. Aaron confronts Gordon about the past, and Gordon leaves. Aaron later tells Chas about Gordon's abuse. Aaron refuses to report Gordon to the police, so Chas confronts Gordon, who admits he abused Aaron. Chas tells Aaron that Gordon admitted to abusing him. Chas then tells Cain, who goes to Gordon's home to get revenge. When Aaron learns of this he stops Cain by agreeing to go to the police. Gordon is brought in for questioning, maintaining his innocence and branding his son a liar. Gordon also informs the police of Cain's actions against him. Gordon then turns up at the scrapyard to bully Aaron into retracting his statement, he tries to bargain Cain's freedom against Aaron's case.

Robert helps Aaron track down his stepmother, Sandra (Joanne Mitchell) and his younger half-sister, Liv Flaherty (Isobel Steele). Aaron pleads for Sandra's help, but she is adamant that she knows nothing. When Sandra says she changed her surname to keep Liv safe, Aaron works out that she knows what happened. He tells Liv what kind of person their father is and returns home. A second person had come forward to say Gordon abused him. The police inform Aaron that, because of the second statement, they are pressing charges against Gordon. Aaron later spots Robert and Ryan Harred (George Sampson) together and learns Robert paid Ryan to give a false statement. Aaron asks Ryan to retract his statement and he agrees. Liv is convinced Aaron is lying about their dad abusing him. Chas convinces Sandra to give a statement to the police and Liv comes to stay with Aaron for a while. Gordon is found guilty and Liv moves into The Woolpack, after she refuses to move to Dublin with Sandra. Gordon is sentenced to 18 years in prison. Aaron changes his surname to Dingle. Gordon later takes his own life in prison. Aaron, Liv, Robert and Chas attend Gordon's funeral.

Aaron finally vents his anger at his father and promises to take care of Liv. Aaron meets Chrissie's sister Rebecca White (Emily Head) and learns that Robert had had an affair with her while dating Chrissie in the past. Aaron overhears Chrissie's teenage son, Lachlan White (Thomas Atkinson), threatening to make false allegations of sexual abuse against Robert and warns him to stay away. Robert calms Aaron down and they later meet at a barn, where Aaron shows Robert that he has Lachlan tied up in the boot of his car. Lachlan escapes and they are forced to give chase and stop him falling over the edge of a cliff. Lachlan almost forces Aaron over until Robert pulls him off. Lachlan tells Aaron that Robert is having an affair with Rebecca. With Lachlan back in the boot, Aaron and Robert talk and Robert admits he is bisexual. While driving back to the village, Robert produces a ring and tells Aaron he was going to propose. Aaron takes his eyes off the road, but Robert yells at Aaron to watch out and he loses control of the car trying to avoid a pile-up on the road and they crash into a water-filled quarry. Aaron later accepts Robert's proposal and goes on to recover from his injuries. Robert continues to spend time with Rebecca, to help find evidence against the Whites and help Andy, who is on the run after being framed by Chrissie for attempting to murder Lawrence White (John Bowe), when in actuality Andy was framed by Chrissie in order to protect the true culprit, her son Lachlan.  Aaron tries to remain calm about it, but becomes envious over the amount of time the two of them are spending together and is distrustful of Rebecca.

After learning that The Mill is up for auction, Liv offers to use some of her inheritance to help buy it, but Aaron refuses to use Gordon's money. Aaron breaks into Home Farm and empties the safe. Rebecca confronts Aaron at the pub, threatening to call the police. When she asks why Aaron would choose to steal from her, Aaron tells her about Gordon's abuse. Aaron returns the money and he purchases The Mill for himself, Robert and Liv. Aaron ( played by Bryan Parry, in Ashley's vision) finds a confused Ashley wandering around the streets of Hotten and offers to bring him back to the village. He takes him to The Woolpack and is saddened to see the former vicar's rapid decline as his dementia takes hold. Aaron then encourages Chas and Paddy to get back together.

Aaron struggles to hide his jealousy when Robert spends most of his time working on a business plan for Rebecca. Aaron and Robert decide to have a secret wedding in Vegas. However, they argue over the lack of trust in the relationship and Robert removes his engagement ring. Aaron gets drunk and beats Kasim when he sees a disagreement between him and Finn that Aaron interprets as a homophobic attack against Finn. Aaron is arrested and Robert promises to stand by him. Aaron apologises to Finn for attacking Kasim. Finn tells him he deserves to go to prison, but hopes he does not. Aaron meets his estranged grandmother, Faith Dingle (Sally Dexter), and instantly takes a shine to her, despite Chas' disapproval. Liv is disappointed that no one has remembered her birthday and lashes out at Aaron and Chas. Aaron finds her drowning her sorrows at the bridge and carries her home. Aaron gives Liv some belated birthday presents but she gets upset about the thought of him going to prison, causing Aaron to snap at her. He goes out for a run and Faith finds him suffering from a panic attack.

With the help of their families, Robert surprises Aaron with an impromptu wedding ceremony in the Woolpack. Just as the service gets underway, the police turn up looking for Faith. Upset, Robert walks off and Aaron follows him to the garage, where Robert laments that he wanted this day to be perfect, but Aaron assures him it does not matter and produces the rings. They exchange their vows in private before heading back to the pub where they celebrate with their family and friends. Aaron apologises to Robert for having to leave him. Robert assures Aaron that he will wait for him. Aaron is given 12 months in prison. He immediately begins to struggle with the situation. After seeking the advice of one of the guards, Aaron decides to hide his sexuality for his own protection, but instinctively shouts at the prison bully Jason when he sees him abusing a fellow gay inmate. When confronted by his cellmate Ethan, Aaron claims to have a gay brother in order to cover his tracks.

Robert visits Aaron in prison where the pair struggle to hide their emotions. Jason spies Robert gently squeezing Aaron's leg under the table and works out Aaron's sexuality, later confronting him in his cell. Aaron squares up to Jason and calls the thug out on his bigotry. Hearing the guards approaching, Jason and his mates leave but not before threatening Aaron. The next day, Chas visits Aaron and she is dismayed to learn that the inmates are aware of his sexuality after he is openly hassled in the visiting room by Jason though he tries to play it down in front of her. Instinctively, Chas lashes out and tries to warn Jason off. Later, Aaron is cornered by Jason and his mates; the guards manage to pull them apart in time but Aaron is left shaken and afraid by the encounter. The following day, Aaron is unsettled when a fellow inmate recognises him and calls him "Livesy" in front of Jason. Robert visits Aaron again and apologises to him after learning from Chas what happened after the last time he visited. Aaron assures him he's fine but keeps getting more nervous as Jason is watching them. Later, Aaron is shocked when Jason reveals he knew Gordon and confesses that he was the one who got him to kill himself before launching a vicious attack. Battered and bruised, Aaron rings Chas and tells her to see Sarah in Prague, assuring his mum he's ok but after Jason stops by to warn him its only the beginning, he crumples the floor and suffers a severe panic attack.

The next morning, Ethan offers Aaron a joint of spice to help with the pain but Aaron refuses, saying his 6 pm phonecall to Liv and Robert will get him through the day. Aaron is soon cornered by Jason and his mates; they bundle him into a cell and he tries to stand up to them but quickly falls apart when Jason tells him it's the cell where Gordon took his own life. Holding him down, Jason continues to taunt Aaron about his past and tells him he will not kill him as he is already dead inside. Aaron is later found in a near-catatonic state by the prison chaplain, Fr Aiden who delivers some tough love, saying Aaron needs to open up to the people he cares about or end up like Jason. Aaron later makes his phonecall to Liv and Robert but is unable to confide in them. That night in his cell, Aaron gives into temptation and asks Ethan for some spice. The next morning, Aaron asks Ethan for more Spice but his cellmate tells him the only person he can get it off is Jason. Aaron goes to see Jason and is told he can have the drugs if he agrees to do some jobs for him. Aaron is later visited by Liv and Paddy. While Paddy gives them some time alone, Liv immediately senses something is amiss and is shocked to discover her brother is on drugs. Aaron is taken aback by her perceptiveness and begs her not to tell Robert. Liv abruptly asks Paddy to take her home, leaving Aaron crushed. Later, Aaron goes to see Jason again and agrees to deliver drugs to other inmates for him; Ethan warns Aaron if he gets caught, he'll risk his appeal.

Robert comes to visit Aaron again and tells him he knows about the drugs, having learnt the truth from Liv. Aaron is gutted about being found out and Robert is dismayed by Aaron's indifference, both towards the drugs and Liv's recent expulsion from school, causing Aaron to get defensive and orders Robert to leave him alone. A few days later, Robert and Chas visit to tell Aaron his appeal has been successful and he'll be released in a few weeks. Aaron apologises to Robert for the things he said last time he visited and promises he's off the drugs for good.

A few weeks later, Aaron is released and shares an emotional reunion with Robert outside the prison gates. They arrive back at the village where Faith has organised a coming home party. Aaron is soon overwhelmed by it all and after speaking briefly with Rebecca, he rushes outside where he has a panic attack. Robert tries to comfort him but Aaron suddenly turns around and punches him in the face. Horrified by his actions, he quickly apologises before breaking down and admits to Robert what he went through in prison, including being beaten and locked in Gordon's cell. Robert gently assures his Aaron he'll get through this and promises to get him help for his problems.

When Aaron stresses about not being able to support Liv, Robert takes him for a picnic in order to take his mind off things. They have a great time together and Robert tells Aaron he's proud of him. On their way back to the village they are shocked to overhear Rebecca is pregnant. The next day, Aaron attends his first counselling session and with Robert's encouragement finds himself finally able to open up about his problems and admitting that he wants to change. Robert suggests to Aaron that they visit Chas and Liv for a few weeks and after getting the all clear from his probation officer, they leave the village.

After Robert and Aaron return from their break and move into the Mill, Robert breaks down and confesses that he slept with Rebecca, she got pregnant as a result and he told her to have an abortion. Devastated, Aaron orders Robert to leave and nearly self-harms before seeing his counselor.  He tells Robert that he wants to forgive him and move on and Robert eagerly agrees. They are upset to learn the next day that Rebecca is still pregnant.  Though Aaron feels that the baby will always be a reminder of Robert's infidelity and Rebecca tries convincing him to leave Robert, Aaron decides to stand with Robert and convinces him to take an active role in the baby's life.

Despite his best efforts, Aaron is unable to cope with Rebecca's pregnancy.  He self-harms and attempts to buy drugs off of his ex-cellmate, leading to an encounter with Jason. He confesses to Robert that he hates the baby.  Robert suggests that he and Aaron leave the village for good but Aaron breaks up with him, realizing that he's become paranoid and needy around Robert, and chooses to focus on his mental and emotional health.  He leaves the village to visit Chas and Liv for a short time.  Robert tries to reconcile with him upon his return but Aaron is adamant that they stay split up.  Zak begins training him in boxing and after a run-in with Jason, stands up to him.

When Liv returns after looking after her mother, Aaron tries to hide the details about his breakup with Robert, but eventually tells her.  Liv attempts to convince Robert to fight for Aaron, but when he is rude to her in front of Rebecca, she steals his car and a bottle of spiked rum from Home Farm.  Liv passes out from the drugged alcohol and is taken to the hospital.  After Robert admits what he's done with the bottle to Aaron, Aaron promises to end him if Liv does not survive. Liv recovers and plays matchmaker between Aaron and her doctor Alex Mason. Aaron is interested but decides that he is not ready to move on yet. Liv's friend Gerry moves in with them after being kicked out of the B&B by Doug. Aaron reluctantly helps drive Rebecca to the hospital when she goes into labor. After his son is born, Robert makes plans to leave the village, believing that the baby is better off without him. He confesses his schemes against the Whites to Aaron, admitting that he blamed them for his and Aaron's breakup.  Aaron convinces Robert to stay and be a better man and a decent father.  Robert abandons his plotting, but incurs the wrath of the Whites when Rebecca discovers the truth and reveals it all.  An angry and humiliated Lawrence beats up Robert, who seeks Aaron for help. Liv fears that Aaron and Robert will get back together, so she continues to push Dr. Alex Mason on Aaron. Aaron and Alex soon start dating. His family reacts positively to Alex but Aaron is hesitant about the relationship.

At Christmas, a drunk and depressed Robert makes a public plea to get Aaron to come back to him, but insults Alex and embarrasses himself and Aaron in the process.  Later, Robert is hit by the Whites' car and taken to the hospital. Aaron is frightened that Robert will die and admits that he is not ready to lose him. Robert survives and while he recovers, he decides to let Aaron move on and agrees to do the same. Aaron tells Alex that he is committed to them.

In early 2018, Aaron, Cain, and Robert work together to help Adam flee the country after he confessed to the murder of Emma Barton in order to protect the culprit, his mother Moira.  After the Whites are involved in a car crash, Robert takes over full-time parenting duties while Rebecca is in the hospital. Aaron starts helping Robert with childcare and takes a liking to baby Sebastian.  Alex becomes envious of the time that Aaron and Robert are spending together. Aaron tries to cook dinner for him and Alex and calls Robert for help. The two end up having dinner together and nearly kiss, but are stopped by Alex's arrival.

Aaron comforts Liv over her sexuality after Gabby humiliates her at her sixteenth birthday party and advises her not to rush to label herself. By now, Aaron has become less invested in his relationship with Alex. He plans to break up with him, but when he learns of Alex's troubles at work and at home, he reluctantly suggests that he move into the Mill. After Valentine's Day, Aaron is at a bar and sees Robert chatting up another man. Heartsick, Aaron breaks up with Alex and leaves the bar. He and Robert find each other that night and, after tearful confessions, are finally reunited.

After Rebecca is released from the hospital, she, Robert, and Aaron begin co-parenting baby Seb. Rebecca's memory problems put Seb at risk, so he moves in with Robert and Aaron full-time while she heals.  They, along with Cain and Moira, are forced to deal with Syd – the prisoner collaterally involved in Adam's escape – when he invades the Mill and later kidnaps Aaron in exchange for €10,000.  Robert resorts to making a deal with Joe Tate (Ned Porteous) to get the money.  At the pub, Chas and Paddy reveal that she is pregnant, and Aaron, though surprised, is happy for them. Liv and Gabby accidentally spike Lisa's drink with ketamine meant for Daz, causing her to go to the hospital.  When Aaron discovers Liv's part in it, he advises her to keep quiet, but she confesses when Gabby is questioned by the police. Liv is later arrested and sent to juvenile detention for several months due to Joe Tate's interference.  Aaron calls Liv in prison to inform her that Gerry has died.  He is distraught to learn about Liv's drinking problem, but does his best to get her help. He also helps support his mother and Paddy when they learn that their unborn baby has bilateral renal agenesis and will not survive birth.

Over the summer, Aaron and Robert get engaged again. Rebecca goes missing and when Lachlan's murder spree is revealed, Robert worries about her.  Aaron worries that the stress of it is getting to him and tells Robert to take it easy and focus on Sebastian but Robert is determined to find Rebecca because he cannot handle his son growing up without his mother just like he did but the stress becomes to much for Robert and he has a seizure. Over the few months Lachlan has Rebecca kidnapped, Robert and Aaron start to lose hope of her return and Robert then asks Aaron if Rebecca does not come back he could adopt Sebastian which Aaron is more than happy about, but the adoption does not go ahead as Rebecca eventually escapes Lachlan and returns home. Chas goes into labour during Aaron and Robert's bachelor party, and gives birth to a daughter named Grace, who lives for only a short time after birth. During this time Aaron and Robert get married legally in the village, but mourns the loss of his half-sister.

After Lachlan is put in prison, Rebecca gets back together with Ross and they decide to move to Liverpool with their sons for a fresh start. Aaron and Robert try to fight it, leading to a custody battle, which ends with Robert giving Rebecca his blessing to take Seb. Aaron has grown attached to Seb and has trouble letting go, but he and Robert start making plans to have a child of their own. They decide on surrogacy as the best option, though they struggle on how to pay for it. However, in the spring of 2019, the surrogacy is put on hold when Robert's sister Victoria is raped at a party by Lee Posner (Kris Mochrie) and Aaron and Robert put their energy into supporting her.

Victoria's case is dismissed due to lack of evidence. Aaron and Robert get revenge on Lee by putting up posters of him with the words "RAPIST" around his workplace, sparking a feud between them and Lee and his mother, Wendy (Susan Cookson). Lee and Wendy harass Victoria when they learn of her pregnancy and state that they intend to file for custody. Robert becomes more and more fueled by his hatred for Lee, leading him to take drastic measures such as hiring Dawn Taylor to trap Lee. Eventually, Lee admits to Robert that he raped Victoria, and Robert bludgeons him with a shovel, putting him in coma. Robert is charged with GBH with intent facing a life sentence. Aaron is devastated to learn that Robert might spend life in prison. When Lee dies from an internal bleeding on the brain, it becomes a murder case. Liv insists Robert goes on the run and Aaron goes too. They both refuse this but Liv tells them it's their only option as they cannot be without each other. Aaron agrees and tells Robert he is not going anywhere without him. Aaron and Robert pack and say their goodbyes to Liv and Victoria and when Aaron goes to see Paddy and a heavily pregnant Chas, Robert says his goodbyes to Sebastian and tells him he loves him. Robert and Aaron tell Paddy and Chas everything and Chas refuses for him to leave before giving him the ultimatum of choosing between Robert and his family, to which Aaron chooses Robert and says he cannot live without him, and then they go on the run.

Aaron and Robert are at a small hotel where they are hiding and planning their escape to France by ferry and are using fake passports which they got from Mandy Dingle who accidentally smuggled Liv into the back of the van and Liv tells them she is coming too, she tells Aaron that they cannot live without each other and she cannot live without him and then says she cannot live without either of them as they are a family, Aaron and Robert do not think it's a good idea for a 17-year-old to be living her life on the run and they all have an emotional goodbye and Paddy and Chas then follow the boys to pick up Liv after they got the truth from Mandy about where Liv is, just as Liv arrives back to Paddy and Chas the police stop them after following them from the village they make up a story about where they are going and tells the police they are on the way to the hospital as her waters have broke but the police find the address of where Aaron and Robert are on their GPS and head that way just as Liv arrives to the car. Aaron and Robert hear the sirens and run for it where they hide in a forest nearby they sit against a tree and Aaron rings Chas so they can get some money and just before he goes to see her, Robert asks Aaron to give chas his watch to give to Sebastian and then discuss their future, they talk about how proud Seb will be of Robert for sacrificing so much for the people he loves and they talk about growing old together and make a few jokes before sharing a kiss, saying they are in this together and Robert says to Aaron that he does not care where he is in his life as long as he can live it with Aaron, he says to Aaron that he promised to give Aaron the best life and that's what he's going to get and Aaron says he will wait before sharing another kiss and a long hug, but Aaron does not realise Robert is saying goodbye to him and he is about to make the most ultimate sacrifice for him. Aaron meets Liv, Paddy and Chas who he gives the watch to during their conversation however, the police drive past and Aaron realises they are heading towards where Robert is and Aaron then runs back while Liv, chas and Paddy all chase after him when he comes to the opposite side of the road where the hotel is he sees the police arresting him, Aaron is hysterical and tries to get to him as Paddy and Liv pull him back to stop him from getting hit by an up-and-coming van he is still hysterical and can see Robert looking towards him in devastation, Aaron questions what he's doing and Chas tells him he turned himself in to which Aaron questions again before she says he did it for him, he starts shouting for Robert and screams that they were meant to do this together before questioning what he's going to do without him. The next day, Aaron is struggling to cope without Robert and cannot understand why Robert left him and chas tells him he did it so Aaron can have his freedom and he says he does not know what he will do without him. Aaron goes down to the police station and tells the police that he's not going to leave until he sees Robert, but it does not work but later on he gets a call from Robert after one of the police officers tell Robert his husband was asking for him and allowed Robert to call him even though the police officer was not allowed to, on the phone Robert explains why he did it and tells him he loves him and he always will but his family need him, when Aaron finds out Robert has a trial the week after he arranges with Billy the guy from prison to help break Robert out of prison so they can go ahead with their plan but Billy refuses and leaves. Paddy finds out about Aaron's plan through Billy and Paddy tells Liv to get Aaron to come back to the mill anyway she can, Aaron runs to the mill as Liv tells Aaron that Paddy is having a heart attack but he finds out it's a trap and Paddy locks all three of them in the mill and throws the keys in the plug holes to stop Aaron from going ahead with his plan. Aaron starts to become angry telling paddy to move and let him out and Paddy asks Aaron if he is going to hit him if he does not and Liv finds out about the time Aaron hit Paddy before, he tells Paddy that if he loved him he will let him out and he can be without Robert, Aaron then nearly hits Paddy before Liv pushes him away and asks Aaron if he is going to hit her, when they have all calmed down Liv breaks down in tears and she does not think Aaron cares about her as he was planning on leaving and still is without Liv and reminds Aaron she is his little sister and she needs him, Aaron then promises Liv he will not leave. They all eventually get rescued from the mill with a spare key hidden under a plant pot that Lydia hart opened for them after she went to tell them that Chas has gone into labour and is giving birth in the men's toilet that she is currently trapped in alongside Marlon Dingle, they all run to the pub and eventually Paddy manages to see his son being born, after the birth they discover the baby is actually a girl and Aaron's new little sister, they call her Eve Theodore Dingle and then shortened her name to Eve Teddy Dingle.

The trial then approaches and Aaron is worried about it even though he knows Robert is going to plead guilty anyway. To make it worse Wendy turns up along with Lee's brother, Luke, who Victoria happens to know and is shocked to discover Lee's brother is the same guy she was chatting up and thought it was all a plan but He said he had no idea it was her and his mother said she was clueless. Robert then arrives on stand and he takes a glance at Aaron, he pleads guilty to murder and is sentenced to life imprisonment with a minimum of 14 years without parole, Aaron, Liv and Victoria are shocked he does not get parole as Robert is being sent down he looks at Aaron who looks back and he whispers to Aaron that he loves him. Outside the courts, Lee's mother is angry that Robert only got 14 years but Liv reminds her it's life but she says it's 14 years and will get out eventually and he deserves to never come out and Aaron gets angry at her over it.

After Aaron sees his newborn sister, he sits at home and watches a video Robert recorded for him and the rest of his family saying goodbye, he tells Aaron he might never have to see the video because they have their lives together but if it does not go to plan, he wanted Aaron to know he loves him and he will love him forever and Aaron breaks down in tears. Robert is later transferred to a prison on the Isle of Wight. He removes Aaron from his prisoner contact list and files for divorce, presumably in an attempt to force Aaron to move on with his life. Aaron takes the news very poorly. He tries to focus on being a stepfather to Seb, but Rebecca later asks that he stop seeing him. Wendy insists on moving into the village to be close to her grandchild and Luke joins her. Though Wendy soon endears herself to Paddy and Chas by helping their baby with feeding, Aaron and Victoria are furious at her presence and plot to get her to leave. Aaron and Luke come to blows on several occasions, and he stalks and harasses Wendy to get her to leave. He also starts going on dating apps and having one-night stands with random men. Victoria and Liv catch one of his hookups trying to steal from him and he snaps at them for interfering. He later apologises, admitting how much it hurts after losing Robert, and takes a break from the village. Aaron later returns and is reunited with his half-sister Liv Flaherty, mother Chas Dingle and stepfather Paddy Kirk. He becomes a godfather to his half-sister Eve Dingle.

Casting
Jake Roche auditioned for the role of Aaron, however, it was actor Danny Webb who was eventually cast. Aaron first appeared in Emmerdale in 2003 as a recurring character. In 2008, Aaron was reintroduced as a full-time cast member and the decision was made to recast the part. Former Grange Hill actor Danny Miller successfully auditioned for the role of Aaron. Miller admitted in an interview with Sue Crawford of The People that he would have quit acting for good if he had not landed the role. On 20 December 2016, Aaron was temporarily played by actor Bryan Parry in a special episode focusing on the viewpoint of dementia patient Ashley Thomas (John Middleton).

Development

Characterisation
Violent, angry and always in trouble, the character quickly established himself as the 'baddest' of bad boys. Describing Aaron, Lucy Pargeter (Chas Dingle) said "Aaron's an absolute pain in the arse for Chas. Danny Miller, who plays him, is brilliant. He gives so much and he's only young".

Sexuality

A high-profile storyline for the character was when he began to question his sexual orientation. As the storyline progressed, Aaron was seen struggling to come to terms with his sexuality, before admitting the truth to his friend and guardian Paddy Kirk (Dominic Brunt). Miller admits that he was apprehensive when the Emmerdale writers approached him and told him they were making Aaron gay. Miller said "Being a straight actor and having to kiss another lad, I'm not going to lie, I was a bit worried about it, because it's a great test of your acting skills."

Miller's co-star, Dominic Brunt has praised the storyline and told Media and Entertainment website, Digital Spy, that "It's done more realistically than I've seen in a soap." He went on to describe Aaron as being a homophobic homosexual, who doesn't like what he is. Miller has stated that he is enjoying the challenge presented by the storyline saying "It's definitely been a big challenge – I feel a big responsibility to get this right and portray it in a way that makes it real, because there are so many lads who are going through what Aaron is going through". Miller's co-star James Sutton, who previously played a gay character in Hollyoaks, has said that Miller did not need any advice for the role and said, "We've chatted but I've given him no advice – he's a great actor, he doesn't need me to give him any pointers".

Emmerdale producer Gavin Blyth explained the gay plotline to Miller saying, "There are hundreds of thousands of teenage lads out there who are struggling with it as we speak – they're sexually confused". He also added "Aaron keeps it in so much because he's worried about what people think of him". Miller has admitted that he felt "awkward" and "strange" when he filmed an intimate moment with his Emmerdale co-star Adam Thomas, who is his real-life flatmate. He said "You'd never think yourself to be in the position that these two are in. Knowing myself and knowing Adam and his long-term girlfriend, he's the last person you'd expect in that position."

Departure (2012)
On 18 November 2011, Miller announced he would be leaving Emmerdale in 2012. Of his decision to leave, Miller said "It has been an incredibly difficult decision but after three years playing Aaron and much soul-searching, I am eager to explore other roles. I am so grateful to Emmerdale for the opportunity that I have been given and have loved every moment. I will miss everyone enormously but this might not be the last we see of Aaron." Series producer Stuart Blackburn said he respected Miller's decision and was grateful for the hard work he had put into the role of Aaron. On 20 January 2012, Miller revealed the Emmerdale team were still discussing how to write out Aaron. The actor said "They keep chopping and changing [it] – I think because they want to make it quite impactful and dramatic. I hope it's not leaving in the back of a cab, but there's great storyliners and a great team there."

In February 2012, Susan Hill of the Daily Star reported Aaron would exit the village in "heartbreaking scenes" after turning down the chance to leave with his new man, Ed Roberts (Lloyd Everitt). Hill said the show's bosses were desperate to get the character's departure right and spent months coming up with a dramatic storyline. Details of what happens to stop Aaron having a happy ending were being kept under wraps. The following month, Miller and other members of the cast and crew were spotted filming Aaron's final scenes at Robin Hood Airport. Paul Millar of Digital Spy reported that Aaron's final scenes could see him on the run from the police after being accused of setting fire to the garage. Aaron made his last screen appearance on 5 April 2012.

In honour of his departure, the cast and crew made a parody video for the song "Written in the Stars" by Tinie Tempah.

Reintroduction (2014)
On 4 April 2014, Daniel Kilkelly from Digital Spy reported that Miller would be returning to Emmerdale. Kilkelly said that while producers had yet to officially announce the news, a show insider had confirmed Miller's return. Aaron will make his on-screen return later in the year. Aaron returned on 14 August 2014 to help Adam out of a scam that he was involved with Ross Barton and Donna Windsor.

Child sexual abuse
On 21 January 2016, a new story arc for Aaron began when he revealed to his ex-lover Robert Sugden that he was raped by his father, Gordon, when he was a child. Aaron explained to Robert that Gordon repeatedly raped him throughout his childhood from the age of 8 before Gordon kicked him out. Two weeks later on 3 February 2016, Aaron tells his mother Chas what Gordon did to him. After the emotional episode aired, Miller was overwhelmed by the response to his child abuse storyline with fans and co-stars praising his performance on Twitter. On 16 February 2016, it was announced that a new character would become involved in the storyline with Aaron; newcomer Ryan Harred (played by George Sampson). A week later, it's revealed that Robert paid Ryan to lie about being abused by Gordon in order for the police to charge him. On 15 April 2016, the jury found Gordon guilty of raping Aaron.

Car crash stunt
In May 2016, new Emmerdale producer Iain Macleod reveals Aaron will be heavily involved in the big October storyline along with Robert. Aaron and Robert will be caught in explosive and heartstopping twists. Iain says, "It's a massive, big storyline for Robron. It's funny, romantic and heartstopping in places. People will be on the edge of their seat – or possibly falling off the end of it. I think viewers want us to keep them together and they have earned the right to be together for a period. Obviously, there will be challenges, but I’m really rooting for them, I hope that they can make it through!"

Departure (2021) and return stint
On 16 November 2021, ITV announced that Miller would be competing in their competition series I'm a Celebrity...Get Me Out of Here!, meaning that a temporary exit for Aaron was speculated. However later that day, it was announced that Miller would not be returning to Emmerdale following his participation in the competition. Aaron's exit scenes were broadcast on 6 December 2021, as he leaves the village following the death of his partner Ben Tucker (Simon Lennon). However, under a year later, it was announced that Miller would reprise his role as Aaron for a guest stint in October 2022, as part of Emmerdales 50th anniversary celebrations.

Reception
For his portrayal of Aaron, Miller was nominated for the "Best Newcomer Award" at the Inside Soap Awards in 2009. Miller won the "Best Actor" award at the 2011 British Soap Awards, he was also nominated for "Sexiest Male". Miller was nominated in the category of "Serial Drama Performance" at the 2012 National Television Awards. The character was selected as one of the "top 100 British soap characters" by industry experts for a poll to be run by What's on TV, with readers able to vote for their favourite character to discover "Who is Soap's greatest Legend?". Miller was nominated for Best Actor for the 2015 British Soap Awards and won the 2014 Best Moment in All About Soap Awards (with Ryan Hawley, who played Aaron's on-off lover Robert). He won the Best Actor Award at the 2015 TV Choice Awards. In August 2017, Miller was longlisted for "Best Actor" at the Inside Soap Awards, while he and Hawley were longlisted for "Best Partnership". Both nominations made the viewer-voted shortlist. On 6 November 2017, Miller won the accolade for "Best Actor". Aaron's pairing with Robert won the accolade for "Best Soap Couple" at the 2018 Digital Spy Reader Awards.

A writer for Holy Soap said Aaron's most memorable moment was "His realisation about his sexuality and the emotional scenes where he told Paddy the truth." Miller revealed that he had been verbally abused in public for portraying a bad boy and a homosexual. He stated some viewers initially found it difficult to differentiate between character and actor. Miller said, "I get the odd bit of trouble here and there but nothing that I can't handle. I get people shouting stuff, names in the street, but nothing serious." He added, "There are people who think I'm the character but when they realise you're not they warm to you." Sarah Ellis of Inside Soap said that "given the impact he's had on Emmerdale, Aaron's farewell was always going to be an emotional one." The writer said that she and all of her colleagues from the publication will miss him. Ellis added that she would also "love" to watch Aaron in a spin-off series set in France. A reporter writing for the Inside Soap Yearbook 2017 named Aaron's "abuse agony" as one of the "best bits of February", describing viewers as being left "stunned" when he revealed he was abused by his father. They praised the scenes between Aaron and Chas at the seaside.

See also
List of soap operas with LGBT characters

References

External links
Aaron Livesy at itv.com
Aaron Livesy at Holy Soap

Emmerdale characters
Fictional gay males
Fictional mechanics
Male villains
Television characters introduced in 2003
Fictional criminals in soap operas
Male characters in television
Fictional LGBT characters in television
Fictional prisoners and detainees
Fictional victims of sexual assault
Fictional victims of child sexual abuse
Self-harm in fiction
LGBT villains